In the Hebrew Bible, the coat of many colors is the name for the garment that Joseph owned, which was given to him by his father, Jacob.

Biblical narrative

Joseph's father, Jacob (also called Israel), favored him and gave Joseph the coat as a gift; as a result, he was envied by his brothers, who saw the special coat as an indication that Joseph would assume family leadership. His brothers' suspicion grew when Joseph told them of his two dreams (Genesis 37:11) in which all the brothers bowed down to him. The narrative tells that his brothers plotted against him when he was 17, and would have killed him had not the eldest brother Reuben interposed. He persuaded them instead to throw Joseph into a pit and secretly planned to rescue him later. However, while Reuben was absent, the others planned to sell him to a company of Ishmaelite merchants. When the passing Midianites arrived, the brothers dragged Joseph up and sold him to the merchants for 20 pieces of silver. The brothers then dipped Joseph's coat in goat blood and showed it to their father, saying that Joseph had been torn apart by wild beasts.

Translation

According to the King James Version, Genesis 37:3 reads, "Now Israel loved Joseph more than all his children, because he was the son of his old age: and he made him a coat of many colours."

The Septuagint translation of the passage uses the word  (poikilos), which indicates "many coloured"; the Jewish Publication Society of America Version also employs the phrase "coat of many colours". On the other hand, the Revised Standard Version and the Revised English Bible translate ketonet passim as "a long robe with sleeves" while the New International Version notes the translation difficulties in a footnote, and translates it as "a richly ornamented robe".

Aryeh Kaplan in The Living Torah gives a range of possible explanations, calling the coat a "royal garment". It notes that passim has been translated as "colorful, embroidered, striped, or with pictures," also suggesting that the word could mean a "long garment" which reaches the hands and feet. The book also acknowledges that the word could discuss the material of the coat, which may have been wool or silk.

James Swanson suggests that the phrase indicates a "tunic or robe unique in design for showing special favour or relationship" and that "either the robe was very long-sleeved and extending to the feet, or a richly-ornamented tunic either of special colour design or gold threading, both ornamental and not suitable for working."

The phrase is used one other time in the Hebrew Scriptures, to describe the garment worn by Tamar, daughter of David, in 2 Samuel 13:18-19.

In post-Biblical writing 
In Thomas Mann's tetralogy Joseph and His Brothers, the Coat of Many Colors acts as a central symbol. Mann was keenly interested in the coat and studied its etymology, referring to it in German with translations that reflect both the many-colored and long-sleeved aspects of the garment, as well as calling it by the untranslated ketonet passim. The coat appears at critical points in all four of the novels, and Mann alters the Biblical history to have the coat exist long before Joseph, symbolically tying the garment back to the veil of Ishtar who appears in the prologue of the narrative. The coat is covered in images which refer back to ancient Mesopotamian myths, contributing to the way in which Mann associates Joseph with characters from other religious traditions such as the Buddha and Hermes.

Scholarly debate 
Recent scholarship, especially among literary critics, has noted how the exhortation to "identify" and the theme of recognition in Genesis 37:32-33 also appears in 38:25-26, in the story of Judah and Tamar. This serves to connect the chapters and unify the narrative. Victor Hamilton calls these "intentional literary parallels," while Robert Alter suggests that the verb "identify" plays "a crucial thematic role in the dénouement of the Joseph story when he confronts his brothers in Egypt, he recognizing them, they failing to recognize him."

In popular culture
The coat is featured in the musical Joseph and the Amazing Technicolor Dreamcoat. 
 In 1997, Anita Diamant's novel The Red Tent, Dinah mentions that Rachel is making a colorful garment for her son Joseph; she also mentions that it will make him the target of his brothers' taunting.
In the video game Castlevania: Symphony of the Night for PS1, a cloak called "Joseph's cloak" can be found in the American localization of the game.
The video game Darkest Dungeon added an item named Coat of Many Colors as part of the Color of Madness DLC. 
The coat is referenced in the 1971 Dolly Parton song "Coat of Many Colors".

References

Biblical phrases
Jacob
Joseph (Genesis)
Book of Genesis
Hebrew Bible objects
Fictional garments
Coats (clothing)